Al-Sayf al-Saqil fi al-Radd 'ala Ibn Zafil, is a theological book, written by the Shafi'i-Ash'ari scholar Taqi al-Din al-Subki (d. 756/1355), as a refutation against Ibn al-Qayyim's poem entitled al-Kafiya al-Shafiya fi al-Intisar lil-Firqa al-Najiya, known popularly as al-Qasida al-Nuniyya.

Al-Subki considered the poem to be blasphemous due to its ideological practice of takfir (excommunication of other Muslims), and due to its theological deviations about the Divine Attributes, i.e., anthropomorphism and anthropopathism.

Al-Subki purposely cited sections of the poem and also referred to Ibn Taymiyya. He strove to disqualify the derogatory designations used by Ibn al-Qayyim when he referred to the Ash'aris as Jahmiyya and Mu'attila, etc. Moreover, al-Subki explored several theological aspects concerning God's entity and His attributes in terms of figurative interpretation (ta'wil) and also deals with eschatological issues.

The book was re-edited and commented on by Hanafi Maturidi scholar Muhammad Zahid al-Kawthari (d. 1371/1951), under the title of Tabdid al-Zalam al-Mukhim min Nuniyyat Ibn al-Qayyim.

The Hanafi hadith scholar Murtada al-Zabidi (d. 1205/ 1791) — in the introduction to his book Ithaf al-Sada al-Muttaqin (commentary on Ihya' 'Ulum al-Din by al-Ghazali) — quoted at some length from the refutation written by al-Subki.

Notes

See also 
 Al-Baz al-Ashhab
 Ta'sis al-Taqdis
 List of Sunni books

References

External links 
 Book's page on Goodreads — Goodreads.com

Sunni literature
Ash'ari literature
Kalam
Books about anthropomorphism in Islamic theology
Islamic belief and doctrine